Birds of Prey is a 1997 novel by Wilbur Smith set in the late 17th century. The novel was the first in the third sequence of the Courtney series of novels, and as of 2013 was chronologically the first in the entire series.

Smith says the book established the characteristics of the family: "Right from Birds of Prey... the Courtneys were pirates, merchants, looking to seize the main chance. They were very much driven by monetary considerations. But with the Ballantynes it was much more empire, patriotism, glory – the soldierly virtues."

Plot
In 1667 Holland is at war with England. Sir Francis Courteney and his son Hal attack ships of the Dutch East India Company off the coast of Africa. They are betrayed and Sir Francis is executed. Hal winds up working for Prester John.

Adaptation
Film and television rights to the book were bought by Corona Pictures, but  no adaptation has been filmed.

References

External links
Review at Publishers Weekly

Novels by Wilbur Smith
1997 British novels
Novels set in the 1660s
Macmillan Publishers books